South Carolina Highway 72 Business may refer to:

South Carolina Highway 72 Business (Chester), a former business loop in Chester
South Carolina Highway 72 Business (Clinton), a business loop in Clinton
South Carolina Highway 72 Business (Greenwood), a business loop in Greenwood
South Carolina Highway 72 Business (Rock Hill), a former business loop in Rock Hill

072 Business
072 Business